The Minke, Orca, Sillimanite and Wingate fields are natural gas reservoirs and gas production facilities in the southern North Sea; they are close to, or straddle, the United Kingdom / Netherlands median line. Natural gas, which is routed to the Netherlands, has been produced from the fields since 2007.

The fields. 
The  Minke, Orca, Sillimanite and Wingate fields (UK Block 44) are located north of the Greater Markham Area gas fields (UK Block 49) which also straddles the UK / Netherlands median line. 

Minke and Orca are named after species of whale, Sillimanite is named after a mineral. Details of the gas fields is summarised in the table.

Development 
The gas fields were developed by offshore platforms, subsea wellheads and pipelines. Details are summarised in the table.

Production 
Gas production from the fields is summarised below.

Production from the Minke field in mcm was:Production from the Orca field in mcm was:Production from the Wingate field in mcm was:

Decommissioning. 
Neptune Energy submitted a Decommissioning Programme for Minke to the UK Oil and Gas Authority in 2019.

See also 

 Greater Markham Area gas fields
 List of oil and gas fields of the North Sea

References 

North Sea energy
Natural gas fields in the Netherlands
Natural gas fields in the United Kingdom